Netflix is an American on-demand internet streaming media provider. The company was founded by Reed Hastings and Marc Randolph on August 29, 1997, in Scotts Valley, California. It specializes in and provides streaming media and video-on-demand online and DVD by mail. In 2013, Netflix expanded into film and television production, as well as online distribution.

Due to entering into production and not only releasing of original content and its reception, Films and tv programs produced and distributed by Netflix were eligible  for major awards. On July 18, 2013, Netflix became the first streaming platform to produce a tv program specifically for streaming and to earn major nominations and eventually win a Primetime Emmy Award. Also House of Cards became the first online-only web television program to be nominated and its pilot episode, "Chapter 1", was the first webisode of a television series to win an Emmy.

On January 12, 2014,  Robin Wright (House of Cards) was the first actress to be nominated for a web television program produced by streaming platform and to win the award at the Golden Globe Awards. Netflix was also the first high-profile streaming service whose film production company  produced a film who earned an Academy Award nomination. In addition, Netflix has earned accolades with different peers groups and associations, including: Television Critics Association Awards, BAFTA Awards, Critics' Choice Television Awards, Screen Actors Guild Awards and others.

History and achievements
In 2013, originals like House of Cards and Orange Is the New Black received critical acclaim from critics and viewers. As a result, programs produced or streamed by Netflix earned fourteen Primetime Emmy nominations for original online-only web television programs. House of Cards''' pilot episode "Chapter 1" was awarded the Primetime Emmy Award for Outstanding Directing for a Drama Series, becoming the first webisode of a television series to win an Emmy. Other nominations included Outstanding Drama Series, Outstanding Lead Actor in a Drama Series (Kevin Spacey) and Outstanding Lead Actress in a Drama Series (Robin Wright). On December 11, 2013, Kevin Spacey (House of Cards) and Jason Bateman (Arrested Development) were the leading actors nominated at the Screen Actor Guild Awards. Spacey for Outstanding Performance by a Female Actor in a Drama Series and Bateman for Outstanding Performance by a Male Actor in a Comedy Series The day after, House of cards and Orange is the new black both earned six Golden Globe Award nominations, including Best Television Series – Drama. On January 12, 2014, Robin Wright (House of Cards) won the Golden Globe Award for Best Actress – Television Series Drama for her portrayal of Claire Underwood. With the accolade, Wright became the first actress to win a Golden Globe for an online-only web television series. It was also the first award in an acting category for a Netflix's production. Programs streamed and produced by the company also received nominations for the Writers Guild of America Awards, 
Directors Guild of America Awards and Grammy Awards.

On January 12, 2014, The Square was nominated for an Academy Award, Netflix became the first high-profile streaming service to stream a film nominated for an Academy Award. On February, Orange Is the New Black dominated the Satellite Awards winning Best Television Series – Musical or Comedy, Best Actress – Television Series Musical or Comedy (Taylor Schilling), Best Supporting Actress – Series, Miniseries or Television Film (Laura Prepon) and Best Cast – Television Series. On the drama side, Robin Wright won for Best Actress – Television Series Drama. Later that year, House of Cards earned a British Academy Television Award nomination for Best International Programme and a Critics' Choice Television Award nomination for Best Actress in a Drama Series (Robin Wright). On July 10, 2014, nominations for the 66th Primetime Emmy Awards were announced, with programs produced or streamed by Netflix scoring a total of thirty one. Orange Is the New Black earned a total of twelve nominations, including Outstanding Comedy Series, Outstanding Lead Actress in a Comedy Series (Taylor Schilling), Outstanding Supporting Actress in a Comedy Series (Kate Mulgrew), Outstanding Directing for a Comedy Series (Jodie Foster) and Outstanding Writing for a Comedy Series (Liz Friedman and Jenji Kohan). Nominated for Outstanding Guest Actress in a Comedy Series were Uzo Aduba, Laverne Cox and Natasha Lyonne. Uzo Aduba won the Emmy, becoming the first actress from a Netflix original to win the award. In addition, Laverne Cox made history by becoming the first transgender person ever nominated for a Primetime Emmy Award. Meanwhile, Orange Is the New Black debuted strong, House of Cards increased the number of nominations from nine to thirteen. The political drama held Outstanding Drama Series and both leads in acting. It debuted entries in categories like Outstanding Writing for a Drama Series (Beau Willimon), Outstanding Guest Actor in a Drama Series (Reg E. Cathey) and Outstanding Guest Actress in a Drama Series (Kate Mara).

At the 72nd Golden Globe Awards, Kevin Spacey won in the category Best Actor – Television Series Drama and became first actor to win the award for a program produced by Netflix. On January 15, 2015, Virunga got an Academy Award nomination in the Documentary Feature category, being the second time Netflix streamed a film nominated for an Academy Award. Days later, Kevin Spacey and Uzo Aduba won at the 21st Screen Actors Guild Awards, for Outstanding Performance by a Male Actor in a Drama Series and Outstanding Performance by a Female Actor in a Comedy Series, respectively. Also Orange Is the New Black won the Screen Actors Guild Award for Outstanding Performance by an Ensemble in a Comedy Series. At the Producers Guild Awards, Orange Is the New Black won for Best Episodic Comedy and House of Cards was nominated for the second time. For the 2015 Primetime Emmy awards the company received thirty four nominations, with House of Cards and Unbreakable Kimmy Schmidt leading. Despite the critical acclaim of Season 2, Orange Is the New Black decreased in nominations, from twelve to four, as a result of switching from comedy to drama categories. Tina Fey's Unbreakable Kimmy Schmidt debuted with seven entries, Bloodline with two and Grace and Frankie with one. Uzo Aduba won her second consecutive Emmy, this time in the Outstanding Supporting Actress in a Drama Series category for the episode: "Hugs Can Be Deceiving".

On January 10, 2016, Narcos was nominated for two Golden Globe Awards, including Best Television Series – Drama and Best Actor – Television Series Drama for Wagner Moura. Days later, Master of None made its debut winning the Critics' Choice Television Award for Best Comedy Series. Uzo Aduba and the cast of Orange Is the New Black won a Screen Actors Guild for Outstanding Performance by a Female Actor in a Comedy Series and Outstanding Performance by an Ensemble in a Comedy Series, for a second consecutive time. Kevin Spacey repeated as the winner of the SAG Award for Outstanding Performance by a Male Actor in a Drama Series. For the 88th Academy Awards, Winter on Fire: Ukraine's Fight for Freedom and What Happened, Miss Simone? were nominated. What Happened, Miss Simone? was nominated for a Grammy Award for Best Music Film. For the third season of Orange Is the New Black, Taylor Schilling won for the second time the Satellite Award for Best Actress – Television Series Musical or Comedy. For the 2016 Primetime Emmys, programs streamed by Netflix reached the third place in number of nominations with fifty four. Nominations lead by House of Cards, Making a Murderer, What Happened, Miss Simone? and Master of None. Making a Murderer won for Outstanding Documentary or Nonfiction Series, Outstanding Directing for Nonfiction Programming and Outstanding Writing for Nonfiction Programming. Aziz Ansari and Alan Yang, from Master of None'' won the Emmy for writing the episode "Parents".

Major awards

Academy Awards for films streamed, distributed or produced by Netflix
The Academy Awards, also known as the Oscars, is a set of twenty-three awards for artistic and technical merit in the American film industry, given annually by the Academy of Motion Picture Arts and Sciences (AMPAS), to recognize excellence in cinematic achievements as assessed by the Academy's voting membership. In ten ceremonies, films streamed and distributed, but also produced by Netflix won 22 awards in thirteen categories from 132 nominations in twenty-four categories.

Emmy Awards

An Emmy Award, or simply Emmy, is an American award that recognizes excellence in the television industry, and corresponds to the Oscar (for film), the Tony Award (for theatre), and the Grammy Award (for music). programs streamed and/or produced by Netflix won 265 from 619 nominations. Below is a list of selected categories won by original programming.

Grammy Awards
A Grammy Award (originally called Gramophone Award), or Grammy, is an honor awarded by The Recording Academy to recognize outstanding achievement in the mainly English-language music industry.

Golden Globe Awards

Golden Globe Awards are accolades bestowed by the ninety three members of the Hollywood Foreign Press Association, recognizing excellence in film and television, both domestic and foreign. Films or programs streamed or produced by Netflix received 27 Golden Globe Awards from 156 nominations.

Other awards
Screen Actors Guild Awards

The Screen Actors Guild Award (also known as the SAG Award) is an accolade given by the Screen Actors Guild‐American Federation of Television and Radio Artists (SAG-AFTRA) to recognize outstanding performances in film and television. The statuette given, a nude male figure holding both a mask of comedy and a mask of tragedy, is called "The Actor".British Academy of Film and Television Awards

The British Academy Film Awards and British Academy Television Awards are presented in an annual award show hosted by the British Academy of Film and Television Arts (BAFTA) to honour the best British and international contributions to film and Television.

America Film Institute Awards
The American Film Institute (AFI) is an organization that educates and honors the heritage of the motion picture arts in the United States. The organization is supported by private funding and public membership.Peabody Awards
The George Foster Peabody Awards (or simply Peabody Awards), named after George Peabody, honors stories in television, radio, and online media.

Streamy Awards
The Streamy Awards are awards presented annually in recognition of excellence in streaming media. In 2020, Netflix won Brand of the Year at the 10th Streamy Awards.

Critical reception

Critics' top ten lists

Rotten Tomatoes

Rotten Tomatoes is an American review aggregator website for film and television. Below are listed shows with multiple seasons with aggregate scores.

Metacritic

Metacritic is a website that aggregates reviews of film, television and other media. The scores from each review are averaged  (a weighted average).  Below are listed shows with multiple seasons with aggregate scores.

Statistics

Series with most awards

Person with most awards

Awards by programming
Drama series
 List of awards received by Bloodline
 List of awards received by The Crown
 List of awards received by Daredevil
 List of awards received by The Get Down
 List of awards received by House of Cards
 List of awards received by Jessica Jones
 List of awards received by Luke Cage
 List of awards received by Marco Polo
 List of awards received by Narcos
 List of awards received by The OA
 List of awards received by Orange Is the New Black
 List of awards received by Sense8
 List of awards received by A Series of Unfortunate Events
 List of awards received by Stranger Things

Docuseries
 List of awards received by Chef's Table
 List of awards received by Five Came Back
 List of awards received by Making a MurdererComedy series
 List of awards received by Arrested Development (season 4)
 List of awards received by Fuller House
 List of awards received by Grace and Frankie
 List of awards received by Lady Dynamite
 List of awards received by Love
 List of awards received by Master of None
 List of awards received by One Day at a Time
 List of awards received by The Ranch
 List of awards received by Unbreakable Kimmy Scmidt

Long Form
 List of awards received by Black Mirror
 List of awards received by Gilmore Girls: A Year in the Life

Animated series
 List of awards received by BoJack Horseman
 List of awards received by F Is for Family

See also
 List of TCA Awards received by Netflix
 List of Critics' Choice Awards received by Netflix

References

Lists of accolades received by Netflix
Lists of television series by network